Emamzadeh Hamzeh Ali Rural District is in Boldaji District of Borujen County, Chaharmahal and Bakhtiari province, Iran. At the census of 2006, its population was 684 in 169 households; there were 2,821 inhabitants in 789 households at the following census of 2011; and in the most recent census of 2016, the population of the rural district was 2,569 in 759 households. The largest of its eight villages was Kalbi Bak, with 838 people.

References 

Borujen County

Rural Districts of Chaharmahal and Bakhtiari Province

Populated places in Chaharmahal and Bakhtiari Province

Populated places in Borujen County